Grand and General Council elections were held in San Marino on 25 March 1906.

The Arengo was reconstituted on 25 March, meeting in the Basilica del Santo Marino, and restored its own power to elect the Grand and General Council. It then elected a new Council, with the elected members setting out the conditions for general elections later in the year.

Results

References

San Marino
Elections in San Marino
1906 in San Marino
Non-partisan elections
San Marino
Election and referendum articles with incomplete results